The Chicago Sanitary and Ship Canal, historically known as the Chicago Drainage Canal, is a  canal system that connects the Chicago River to the Des Plaines River.  It reverses the direction of the Main Stem and the South Branch of the Chicago River, which now flows out of Lake Michigan rather than into it. The related Calumet-Saganashkee Channel does the same for the Calumet River a short distance to the south, joining the Chicago canal about halfway along its route to the Des Plaines. The two provide the only navigation for ships between the Great Lakes Waterway and the Mississippi River system.

The canal was in part built as a sewage treatment scheme. Prior to its opening in 1900, sewage from the city of Chicago was dumped into the Chicago River and flowed into Lake Michigan. The city's drinking water supply was (and remains) located offshore, and there were fears that the sewage could reach the intake and cause serious disease outbreaks. Since the sewer systems were already flowing into the river, the decision was made to dam the river and reverse its flow, thereby sending all the sewage inland where it could be treated before emptying it into the Des Plaines.

Another goal of the construction was to replace the shallow and narrow Illinois and Michigan Canal (I&M), which had originally connected Lake Michigan with the Mississippi starting in 1848. As part of the construction of the new canal, the entire route was built to allow much larger ships to navigate it.

The building of the Chicago canal served as intensive and practical training for engineers who later built the Panama Canal. The canal is operated by the Metropolitan Water Reclamation District of Greater Chicago. In 1999, the system was named a Civil Engineering Monument of the Millennium by the American Society of Civil Engineers (ASCE).  The Canal was listed on the National Register of Historic Places on December 20, 2011.

Reasons for construction

Early Chicago sewage systems discharged directly into Lake Michigan or into the Chicago River, which itself flowed into the lake. There were fears that sewage could infiltrate the water supply, leading to typhoid fever, cholera, and dysentery. During a tremendous storm in 1885, the rainfall washed refuse from the river far out into the lake (although reports of an 1885 cholera epidemic are untrue), spurring a panic that a future similar storm would cause a huge epidemic in Chicago. The only reason for the storm not causing such a catastrophic event was that the weather was cooler than normal. The Sanitary District of Chicago (now The Metropolitan Water Reclamation District) was created by the Illinois legislature in 1889 in response to this close call.

In addition, the canal was built to supplement and ultimately replace the older and smaller Illinois and Michigan Canal (built 1848) as a conduit to the Mississippi River system. In 1871, the old canal had been deepened in an attempt to reverse the river and improve shipping but the reversal of the river only lasted one season.  The I&M canal was also badly polluted as a result of unrestricted dumping from city sewers and industries, such as the Union Stock Yards.

Planning and construction, 1887–1922

By 1887, it was decided to reverse the flow of the Chicago River through civil engineering. This low divide had been known since pre-Columbian time by the Native Americans, who used it as the Chicago Portage to cross from the Chicago River drainage to the Des Plaines River basin drainage. The Illinois and Michigan Canal was cut across that divide in the 1840s. In an attempt to better drain sewage and pollution in the Chicago River, the flow of the river had already been reversed in 1871 when the Illinois and Michigan Canal was deepened enough to reverse the river's flow for one season. A plan soon emerged to again cut through the ridge and reverse the flow permanently carrying wastewater away from the lake, through the Des Plaines and Illinois rivers, to the Mississippi River and the Gulf of Mexico. In 1889, the Illinois General Assembly created the Sanitary District of Chicago (SDC) to carry out the plan. After four years of turmoil during construction, Isham Randolph was appointed Chief Engineer for the newly formed Sanitary District of Chicago and resolved many issues circulating around the project. While the canal was being built, permanent reversal of the Chicago River was attained in 1892, when the Army Corps of Engineers further deepened the Illinois and Michigan Canal.

One of the issues for Randolph to resolve was a strike of about 2000 union workers, centered in Lemont and Joliet.  On June 1, 1893, quarrymen went out to protest a wage cut, an action that also drew in 1200 canal workers.  Reports describe 400 quarrymen marching along the length of the canal project on June 2, between Lemont and Romeo, conducting a "reign of terror" at worksites, "armed with clubs and revolvers", "almost crazed with liquor".  On the 9th strikers clashed with replacement workers and local law enforcement, and Governor Altgeld called out the First and Second Regiments of the Illinois National Guard.  Dozens were wounded and at least five killed:  strikers Gregor Kilka, Jacob (or Ignatz) Ast, Thomas Moorski, Mike Berger, and 17-year-old bystander John Kluga.  The strike was settled by the 15th.

The new Chicago Sanitary and Ship Canal, linking the south branch of the Chicago River to the Des Plaines River at Lockport, and in advance of an application by the Missouri Attorney General for an injunction against the opening, opened on January 2, 1900. However, it was not until January 17 that the complete flow of the water was released.  Further construction from 1903 to 1907 extended the canal to Joliet, as the SDC wanted to replace the previously built Illinois and Michigan Canal with the Chicago Sanitary and Ship Canal. The rate of flow is controlled by the Lockport Powerhouse, sluice gates at Chicago Harbor and at the O'Brien Lock in the Calumet River, and also by pumps at Wilmette Harbor.  Two more canals were later built to add to the system: the North Shore Channel in 1910, and the Calumet-Saganashkee Channel in 1922.

Construction of the Ship and Sanitary Canal was the largest earth-moving operation that had been undertaken in North America up to that time.  It was also notable for training a generation of engineers, many of whom later worked on the Panama Canal.  In 1989, the Sanitary District of Chicago was renamed the Metropolitan Water Reclamation District of Greater Chicago.

Diversion of water from Great Lakes

The Chicago Sanitary and Ship Canal is designed to work by taking water from Lake Michigan and discharging it into the Mississippi River watershed.  At the time of construction, a specific amount of water diversion was authorized by the United States Army Corps of Engineers (USACE) and approved by the Secretary of War, under provisions of various Rivers and Harbors Acts; over the years however, this limit was not honored or well regulated.  While the increased flow more rapidly flushed the untreated sewage, it also was seen as a hazard to navigation, a concern to USACE in relation to the level of the Great Lakes and the St. Lawrence River, from which the water was diverted.  Litigation ensued from 1907, which eventually saw states downstream of the canal siding with the sanitary district and those states upstream of Lake Michigan with Canada siding against the district.  The litigation was eventually decided by the Supreme Court in Sanitary District of Chicago v. United States in 1925, and again in Wisconsin v. Illinois in 1929. In 1930, management of the canal was turned over to the United States Army Corps of Engineers. The Corps of Engineers reduced the flow of water from Lake Michigan into the canal, but kept it open for navigation purposes. These decisions prompted the sanitary district to accelerate their treatment of raw sewage.  Today, diversions from the Great Lakes system are regulated by an international treaty with Canada, through the International Joint Commission, and by governors of the Great Lakes states.

Pollution of the Canals

Most local sewers in the Chicago area were built over 100 years ago before wastewater treatment existed. They were designed to drain sanitary flow and a limited amount of stormwater directly into the river. If intercepting sewers and the Metropolitan Water Reclamation District of Greater Chicago (MWRD) water reclamation plants reach capacity during heavy rain, the local sewer continues to drain, or “overflow,” to a waterway, thus causing concern for pollution. However, the MWRD’s Tunnel and Reservoir Plan (TARP) has worked to decrease the combined sewage overflows (CSOs) and nearly eliminated them in the Calumet Area River System.  Since the tunnels became operational in 2006, CSOs have been reduced from an average of 100 days per year to 50. Since Thornton Reservoir came online in 2015, CSOs have been nearly eliminated. TARP captures and stores combined stormwater and sewage that would otherwise overflow from sewers into waterways in rainy weather. This stored water is pumped from TARP to water reclamation plants to be cleaned before being released to waterways.

Asian carp and the Canal

On November 20, 2009, the Corps of Engineers announced a single sample of DNA from Asian carp had been found above the electric barrier constructed in the canal in an attempt to prevent carp from migrating into the Great Lakes. The silver carp, also known as the flying carp, displace native species of fish by filter feeding and removing the bottom of the food chain. It migrated through the Mississippi River system, and could make its way into the Great Lakes, through the man-made canal. Carp were introduced to the U.S. with the blessing of the Environmental Protection Agency (EPA) in the 1970s to help remove algae from catfish farms in Arkansas. They escaped the farms.

On December 2, 2009, the Chicago Sanitary and Ship Canal closed, as the EPA and the Illinois Department of Natural Resources (IDNR) began applying a fish poison, rotenone, in an effort to kill Asian carp north of Lockport. Although no Asian carp were found in the two months of commercial and electrofishing, the massive fish kill did discover a single carp.

On December 21, 2009, Michigan Attorney General Mike Cox filed a lawsuit with the Supreme Court seeking the immediate closure of the Chicago Sanitary and Ship Canal to keep Asian carp out of Lake Michigan. The state of Illinois and the Corps of Engineers, which constructed the Canal, are co-defendants in the lawsuit.

In response to the Michigan lawsuit, on January 5, 2010, Illinois State Attorney General Lisa Madigan filed a counter-suit with the Supreme Court requesting that it reject Michigan's claims. Siding with the State of Illinois, both the Illinois Chamber of Commerce and the American Waterways Operators have filed affidavits, arguing that closing the Chicago Sanitary and Ship Canal would upset the movement of millions of tons of vital shipments of iron ore, coal, grain and other cargo, totaling more than $1.5 billion a year, and contribute to the loss of hundreds, perhaps thousands of jobs. However, Michigan along with several other Great Lakes states argue that the sport and commercial fishery and tourism associated with the fishery of the entire Great Lakes region is estimated at $7 billion a year, and impacts the economies of all Great Lakes states and Canada.

On January 19, 2010, the U.S. Supreme Court rejected the request for a preliminary injunction closing the canal.  In August 2011, the United States Court of Appeals also rejected the preliminary injunction.

See also
 Chicago 1885 cholera epidemic myth
 Chicago flood
 Tunnel and Reservoir Plan (TARP)
 Isham Randolph

References

External links

A History from the Chicago Public Library . (However this credits Rudolph Hering, not Isham Randolph with the project.)
An album of photographs of the dig, including a 26 stanza poem written by Isham Randolph to Admiral Dewey on the opening of the canal

History and Heritage of Civil Engineering – Reversal of the Chicago River
Graph of Lakes Michigan and Huron water levels since 1860
Evaluation of the Potential for Hysteresis in Index-Velocity Ratings for the Chicago Sanitary and Ship Canal Near Lemont, Illinois United States Geological Survey

Canals in Illinois
Ship canals
Water supply and sanitation in the United States
Canals opened in 1900
Canals on the National Register of Historic Places in Illinois
Buildings and structures on the National Register of Historic Places in Chicago
Buildings and structures on the National Register of Historic Places in Cook County, Illinois
Historic districts in Chicago
Illinois waterways
Interbasin transfer
Transportation buildings and structures in Chicago
Transportation buildings and structures in DuPage County, Illinois
Transportation buildings and structures in Will County, Illinois
Lockport, Illinois
United States Army Corps of Engineers
Historic American Engineering Record in Illinois
Historic Civil Engineering Landmarks